Platismatia is genus of medium to large foliose lichens in the family Parmeliaceae. The genus is widespread and contains 11 species. They resemble many other genera of foliose lichens in the Parmeliaceae, particularly Parmotrema, Cetrelia, and Asahinea.  Most species are found in forests  on the trunks and branches of conifer trees, although some species grow on rocks.

Species of Platismatia can be used to produce an orange-brown, yellow-brown, or brown dye, and at least one species was traditionally used to dye wool in Europe.

Species
 Platismatia erosa 
 Platismatia formosana 
 Platismatia glauca 
 Platismatia herrei 
 Platismatia interrupta 
 Platismatia lacunosa 
 Platismatia norvegica 
 Platismatia regenerans 
 Platismatia stenophylla 
 Platismatia tuckermanii 
 Platismatia wheeleri

Gallery

References

Parmeliaceae
Lichen genera
Lecanorales genera
Taxa named by William Louis Culberson
Taxa described in 1968
Taxa named by Chicita F. Culberson